The Madhesh Provincial Assembly (Nepali/Maithili: मधेश प्रदेश सभा) is a unicameral governing and law making body of Madhesh Province, one of the seven Provinces in Nepal, The assembly is seated in the provincial capital at Janakpur in Dhanusha District. The assembly has 107 members, 64 of whom are elected through single-member constituencies and 43 of whom are elected through the party list proportional representation system. They are elected for five-year terms unless the assembly is dissolved earlier.

History 
Provincial assemblies were established in 2015 in accordance with the Constitution of Nepal. The first elections to the assemblies were held in 2017. The inaugural meeting of the assembly was held on 4 February 2018. Saroj Kumar Yadav from  served as the first speaker of the assembly.

The province was previously known as Province No. 2 and Janakpur served as the temporary capital of the province. The 17 January 2022 session of the assembly endorsed a proposal to name the province Madhesh and designated Janakpur as the permanent provincial capital with two-thirds majority.

List of assemblies

Political parties

See also 
 Madhesh Province
 Provincial assemblies of Nepal

References 

Madhesh Province
Province legislatures of Nepal
Unicameral legislatures
Government of Madhesh Province